Gertrude Norman (May 19, 1848 or 1851 – July 20, 1943), was an English/American theater and Hollywood silent film actress. She is credited with being in 44 films between 1911 and 1936. She was also a screenwriter and director for early silent films. She also appeared in four films with sound, making her one of the oldest actresses to perform during the silent and sound eras.

Norman was born in London, England. One of her early films from 1910 was rediscovered in a sea chest in the 2000s. She played a "mother" role in The Birth of a Nation. By the time Norman made her first "talkie" she was already in her 80s and played the part of a grandmother.

She is not to be confused with Gertrude "Toto" Norman (c. 1880–1961), an actress of the same time period as well as secretary and companion to the American opera singer Marcia van Dresser, or with a children's book author Gertrude Norman.

Filmography

References

External links 

19th-century births
1943 deaths
English emigrants to the United States
Actresses from London
20th-century English actresses
20th-century American actresses
American silent film actresses
English silent film actresses